William Samuel Cook "Peter" Ellenshaw (24 May 1913 – 12 February 2007) was an English matte designer and special effects creator who worked on many Disney features. Born in London, he moved to America in 1953.

Career & Life
He first worked in matte painting for producer Alexander Korda on such films as Things to Come (1936), and later on such Powell and Pressburger productions as Black Narcissus (1947) assisting his mentor W. (Walter) Percy Day. A few years later, while still based in Europe, he began to work for Hollywood studios. He worked for MGM on Quo Vadis (1951), but his most extensive association was with Walt Disney Studios beginning with their first completely live action feature film, Treasure Island (1950). He went on to work on 20,000 Leagues Under the Sea (1954) and Mary Poppins (1964), for which he won an Academy Award. He retired after his work on The Black Hole (1979), but contributed matte paintings for Dick Tracy (1990). His son Harrison is also an Academy Award-winning effects designer.

After Peter Ellenshaw retired from the film business, he dedicated his life to his passion for painting.  Numerous works were created, of both Disney and non-Disney themed subjects, which have been highly collected. He was named a Disney Legend in 1993. He is the father of painter Harrison Ellenshaw.

Selected filmography

The Thief of Bagdad (1940), assistant matte artist
A Matter of Life and Death (1946), assistant matte artist
Black Narcissus (1947), assistant matte artist
The Red Shoes (1948), assistant matte artist
Treasure Island (1950), matte artist
20,000 Leagues Under the Sea (1954), matte artist
Davy Crockett, King of the Wild Frontier (1955), matte artist
Old Yeller (1957), matte artist
Johnny Tremain (1957), production designer
Darby O'Gill and the Little People (1959), special effects
Pollyanna (1960), matte artist
Swiss Family Robinson (1960), matte artist
The Absent-Minded Professor (1961), special effects
Mary Poppins (1964), special effects (Academy Award winner)
The Love Bug (1969), special effects
Bedknobs and Broomsticks (1971), art direction (Academy Award nominee)
The Island at the Top of the World (1974), special effects and production design (Academy Award nominee for the latter)
The Black Hole (1979), miniature effects creator (Academy Award nominee for visual effects)
Dick Tracy (1990), matte artist

Books 
 Peter Ellenshaw; Ellenshaw Under Glass - Going to the Matte for Disney
 Mark Cotta Vaz; Craig Barron: The Invisible Art: The Legends of Movie Matte Painting,  Chronicle Books, 2002;

References

External links
Artist's Official Disney Fine Art Site
 Artist's official website biography.
 
 

1913 births
2007 deaths
20th-century English painters
English male painters
21st-century English painters
Best Visual Effects Academy Award winners
Disney people
Matte painters
Painters from London
Special effects people
British expatriates in the United States